Irwin R. Brownstein (November 4, 1930 – March 24, 1996) was an American lawyer and politician from New York.

Life
He was born on November 4, 1930, in New York City. He attended the public schools in Brooklyn. He graduated from Brooklyn College in 1950, and from Brooklyn Law School in 1953. He was admitted to the bar in 1953, and practiced law in New York City.

He was a member of the New York State Assembly (Kings Co., 16th D.) from 1960 to 1963, sitting in the 172nd, 173rd and 174th New York State Legislatures. He resigned his seat in 1963 to run for the State Senate seat vacated by Frank J. Pino.

He was a member of the New York State Senate from 1964 to 1966, sitting in the 174th, 175th and 176th New York State Legislatures. In November 1966, he was elected to the New York City Civil Court.

In November 1968, he was elected to the New York Supreme Court. In June 1973, he was one of the three party designees for Chief Judge of the New York Court of Appeals who were defeated by challenger Jacob D. Fuchsberg in the Democratic primary. In February 1979, Brownstein's son, aged 16, died in a fire while staying with friends over the week-end in Salisbury, Vermont. Brownstein resigned from the bench in 1980, and resumed his private practice instead, specialising in matrimonial and real estate law.

He died on March 24, 1996, while on a family visit in Miami Beach, Florida, of a heart attack.

Sources

1930 births
1996 deaths
Politicians from Brooklyn
Democratic Party New York (state) state senators
Democratic Party members of the New York State Assembly
Brooklyn College alumni
Brooklyn Law School alumni
New York Supreme Court Justices
20th-century American judges
20th-century American politicians